TerraGo is a private company based in Sterling, Virginia with offices in Atlanta, Georgia, and the UK that develops location intelligence, geospatial collaboration, GIS applications, GPS data collection software. Founded in 2005, TerraGo is an In-Q-Tel portfolio company. In 2012, TerraGo acquired fellow In-Q-Tel portfolio company Geosemble. Aside from being an In-Q-Tel portfolio company, TerraGo is notable in part for pioneering the patented technology, related standards and best practices upon which GeoPDF and geospatial PDF are based and programs related thereto.

US National Map 
TerraGo is the platform used by the USGS to deliver the US Topo Quadrangles over the web. The platform is based on a combination of software from multiple vendors, including Esri, TerraGo and others. The maps are delivered as GeoPDF products, which can be consumed by any PDF consuming software, including Adobe Reader.

US Army Geospatial Center 
The US Army Geospatial Center distributes a wide variety of products, including USGS topos, and a variety of National Geospatial-Intelligence Agency maps as GeoPDF maps. Raymond Caputo won the USGIF Geospatial Intelligence Achievement Award in 2008 for his work on the AGC's GeoPDF project, with the citation "This project has been instrumental in getting geospatial information out of the hands of GIS/mapping professionals and into the hands of anyone and everyone who can benefit from its use within the DoD and other sectors in and out of government."

References

External links 
 TerraGo homepage
 US7562289
 AGC GeoPDF Gallery
 GIS User Article on TerraGo Lightweight GIS Applications
 Earth Imaging Journal Article, Gaining True ROI on Geospatial Tech Investments, April 1, 2015
 Consumer Electronics Article on CM-Accuracy on Smartphone with TerraGo Edge 
 American Surveyor

GIS companies